Muhammad Nawaz Irfani (1 January 1970 – 2014) was a Parachinar Pakistan Shia Muslim religious leader, revolutionary, and politician. He was succeeded by Fida Hussain Muzahiri.

Early life
Muhammad Nawaz Irfani was born in Danyor, Gilgit. His early education was in the local school of the village. His family was Ismaili Shia, but his grandfather and father give priority to Twelver Shia Islam over Ismaili religion and linked with Shia Islam. As a result, they had to endure a lot of hardships and trouble.

Educational life
Patiently for all offenses his father sent his dear son to Jamia tul Muntazar Lahore. There he got religious education and benefited from many scholars.

Death
Allama Mohammad Nawaz Irfani was shot dead in Islamabad on Wednesday 26 November 2014. A large number of people from all walks of life attended the funeral, which was held after Friday prayers at the central Eidgah. Later, he was laid to rest at the Eidgah graveyard.
The participants expressed shock and anguish over the killing of the Shia scholar and urged the government to arrest the culprits and award them exemplary punishment.
Local tribes of Kurram Agency announced a 40-day mourning over the killing of Allama Irfani.

See also
 Sheikh Rajab Ali
 Sheikh Ali Madad
 Arif Hussain Hussaini

References

External links
Muhammad Nawaz Irfani Website

1970 births
2014 deaths
Anti-Americanism
Pakistani exiles
Pakistani religious leaders
Shia scholars of Islam
Pakistani Shia Muslims
People from Gilgit District